Therippia signata is a species of beetle in the family Cerambycidae. It was described by Charles Joseph Gahan in 1890, originally under the genus Cacia.

References

Mesosini
Beetles described in 1890